William Hugh "Hughie" Russell (10 March 1921 – 10 December 1991) was an English professional footballer.

Shortly after World War II Russell joined Gillingham, then a non-league team. He scored 98 goals in just 126 games for the Kent side prior to their return to the Football League in 1950, including a haul of nine goals in a match against Gloucester City in the 1946–47 season, a club record for a single match which stands to this day. Contemporary newspaper reports state that he hit the post late on with a shot which could have given him double figures.

Russell remained at the club after its re-election to the Football League, but could not repeat his non-league scoring feats, registering just 8 goals in over 60 matches. He was forced to retire through injury in 1952 and later served as the club's trainer before leaving football entirely to work as a hotelier. He died in Taunton in 1991.

References

1921 births
1991 deaths
People from Redcar
Association football forwards
English footballers
South Bank F.C. players
Bishop Auckland F.C. players
Gillingham F.C. players
English Football League players
British Army personnel of World War II